Glenn H. Gruenhagen (born February 1, 1952) is an American politician from Minnesota. He serves in the Minnesota Senate representing District 17, which includes Carver, McLeod, Meeker, and Sibley Counties. A member of the Republican Party of Minnesota, Gruenhagen has been the subject of both state and national headlines for his opposition to homosexuality and gay marriage, his climate change denial, his opposition to vaccine mandates, his denial of the results of the 2020 United States elections at both the state and federal levels, and his proposal to require instruction in Minnesota high schools on the cause of "sickness, disease, pain, suffering, and death". Gruenhagen works as an insurance agent. He owns Gruenhagen Insurance and Financial Services in Glencoe.

Early life and education
Gruenhagen was born on February 1, 1952, and grew up on a dairy farm near Glencoe, Minnesota. He graduated from Glencoe High School. In 1971, while he was a student at Willmar Junior College, Gruenhagen's draft lottery number was selected. He enlisted in the United States Marine Corps in February 1971 and served at Marine Corps Base Camp Pendleton until his honorable discharge in February 1973.

After his military service, Gruenhagen enrolled at North Hennepin Community College and then the University of Minnesota, where he majored in business. He later received his Chartered Financial Consultant and Chartered Life Underwriter designations from The American College of Financial Services.

Gruenhagen was elected to the Glencoe-Silver Lake school board in 1994 and served in that position for 16 years.

Minnesota state legislature
Gruenhagen was elected to the Minnesota House of Representatives in 2010, defeating Democratic nominee Mick McGuire for the seat representing District 25A, where incumbent representative Laura Brod had declined to seek reelection. After the 2012 redistricting of the Minnesota Legislature, he was elected to represent House District 17B and reelected in 2014, 2016, 2018 and 2020. In 2022, Gruenhagen defeated Democratic nominee Chad Tschimperle 70%-30% to win a seat in the Minnesota Senate, representing District 17.

Political beliefs

Climate change
Gruenhagen has called climate change "a complete United Nations fraud and lie" and claimed that those who believe in it believe that exhalation causes global warming. In a January 2021 committee hearing, he said that 97% of scientists believe in climate change only because of "lies and indoctrination". A few months later, he attempted to amend a large House climate and energy bill to redefine wind power and solar power as "dirty, inefficient and expensive".

Homosexuality and same-sex marriage
Gruenhagen believes homosexuality is "unhealthy" and an "addiction". On March 11, 2013, a day before Minnesota state legislative committees were set to hold a public hearing on a bill that would legalize same-sex marriage in the state, he raised a point of personal privilege on the House floor. He then introduced Kevin Petersen, who Gruenhagen claimed was a friend who had "left the gay lifestyle" after ten years, entered a heterosexual marriage and fathered three children. An activist, Petersen served with Gruenhagen as a member of the Pro-Marriage Amendment Forum, a group advocating for a constitutional amendment in Minnesota to prohibit same-sex marriage.

In March 2022, Gruenhagen opposed a bill banning conversion therapy, expressing his preference that the practice be called "reparative therapy" and remain accessible in Minnesota.

2020 election denial
Following the 2020 United States and Minnesota state election cycles, Gruenhagen was rebuked by the Minnesota Secretary of State when he claimed that a large number of absentee ballots in the 2020 election were not connected to registered voters and called for a forensic audit of the state election. Gruenhagen and several other Minnesota state lawmakers then attended the "Storm the Capital" rally in St. Paul on January 6, 2021, and were later investigated for their participation in the event.

Opposition to vaccine mandates
On January 5, 2023, Gruenhagen and other Republican state lawmakers spoke at a rally opposing the COVID-19 vaccine and workplace mandates requiring employees to receive it. Gruenhagen had previously spoken in support of a bill that would have banned COVID-19 vaccine mandates, required the state to create a "vaccine bill of rights", and set additional requirements regarding the sources of vaccine information medical providers give patients.

Senate File 517
Later that month, Gruenhagen introduced Senate File 517, a bill that would require school districts to "provide instruction to students in grades 9 to 12 exploring the contrast between the scientific facts on how sickness, disease, pain, suffering, and death relate to the existence of complex living organisms, and how sickness, disease, pain, suffering, and death are a consequence imposed by the Creator of complex living organisms."

Personal life
Gruenhagen and his wife Emily have been married since 1975 and have lived in Glencoe since 1978. They have three children. Gruenhagen is a member of the American Legion and the Glencoe Rotary Club. He owns and operates Gruenhagen Insurance and Financial Services.

Electoral history

References

External links 

 Glenn Gruenhagen on Twitter
 Rep. Glenn Gruenhagen official campaign website

1952 births
Living people
People from Sibley County, Minnesota
Republican Party members of the Minnesota House of Representatives
United States Marines
21st-century American politicians
People from Glencoe, Minnesota
Military personnel from Minnesota
School board members in Minnesota
American conspiracy theorists